Nili Tal (born Nili Herman in Tel Aviv, Israel) is an Israeli journalist and documentary film director and producer. She is the great-grandchild of Sigmund Weinberg, one of the pioneers of Turkish cinema.

Career

Journalism
Tal began her journalism career at the Israeli Haaretz daily newspaper in 1965, where she spent ten years. She also contributed as a freelancer to Yedioth Ahronoth and Maariv. She then moved into the television industry and began to work for the Israeli Broadcasting Authority, the sole television network in Israel at the time. She was one of the directors of Mabat Sheni (Second Look) a 60-Minutes-like reporting program.

Documentaries
In her 1984 documentary Eyal she interviewed a narcotics addict. It was the first time a scene of injecting street drugs was shown on TV in Israel, which brought the problematic issue of drugs usage into public debate.

"Sixty and the City" depicts Tal's two-year search for love over the internet. She made "Ukraine Brides" in 2000 and a sequel, "Ukraine Brides 8 Years Later," in 2009. "The Girls from Brazil" (2006-2007 ) depicts her trip to Brazil with four young Israelis searching for their birth mothers. "Till Death Do Us Part" (1998) documents the murder of Einav Rogel on Kibbutz Sha'ar HaGolan. "Murder without a Motive" explores the murder of Asaf Steierman. "Bruna" is a follow up on the Brazilian baby girl who was adopted by an Israeli couple and returned to her birth mother by the courts at the age of two.

Filmography
 The Rise and Fall of Inbal Or (2020) - Commissioned by Yes
 True Crime (2018) - Commissioned by Yes
 Saving Nur (2016) - Commissioned by Channel 1
 Etched In My Body (2015) - Commissioned by Yes
 Ukraine Bride - 13 Years Later (2013) - Commissioned by Yes
 Anna My Love (2012) - Commissioned by Yes
 Who Killed Baby Rose (2011) - Commissioned by Reshet
 Sixty and The City (2010) - Commissioned by Yes
 Ukraine Brides - 8 Years Later (2009) - Commissioned by Yes
 Bruna (2008) - Commissioned by Keshet. Tel Aviv International Documentary Film Festival 2008 (DocAviv), It's All True Film Festival 2008, Brazil, International Women's Film Festival 2008, Rehovot
 The Girls from Brazil (2006-7) - Commissioned by Yes. Tel Aviv International Documentary Film Festival 2007 (DocAviv), São Paulo International Film Festival 2007, Docupolis International Documentary Film Festival of Barcelona 2007, Amsterdam Jewish Film Festival 2007, Austin Jewish Film Festival 2008, and Washington Jewish Film Festival 2008.
 A Line and a half (2006) - Commissioned by Channel 10
 Missing in LA (2006) - Commissioned by Hot
 Women for Sale (2005) - Commissioned by Hot. Tel Aviv International Documentary Film Festival 2005 (DocAviv)
 Murder Without a Motive (2003) - Commissioned by Hot, Reshet. Tel Aviv International Documentary Film Festival 2003 (DocAviv)
 Ukraine Brides (Part I and II) (2000–2001) - Commissioned by Reshet.  Tel Aviv International Documentary Film Festival 2001 (DocAviv)
 The Bridge (2000) - Commissioned by Hot. Winner, Best Documentary,  Tel Aviv International Documentary Film Festival 1999 (DocAviv)
 Shall We Dance (1999) - Commissioned by Channel 2
 Till Death Do Us Part (1998) - Commissioned by Hot
 Flying Alone (1995) - Commissioned by Channel 1
 Acapulco Connection (1995) - Commissioned by Channel 1
 Eyal (1984) - Commissioned by Channel 1

References

External links
Nili Tal website
Amsterdam Jewish Film Festival
Austin Jewish Film Festival
Ukrainian Brides, A documentary directed and produced by Nili Tal
Docupolis International Documentary Film Festival of Barcelona
It's All True International Documentary Film Festival, Brazil
Jewish Film Archive: Till Death Do Us Part
São Paulo International Film Festival
Sunny Side of the Doc: Documentary Film Festival 
Task Force on Human Trafficking: Recommended Books and Films on Human Trafficking (Women for Sale)
The Tel Aviv International Documentary Film Festival (DocAviv)
Washington Jewish Film Festival

Israeli journalists
Israeli film producers
Israeli film directors
1944 births
Living people
Israeli women journalists
Film people from Tel Aviv